Saratoga Battlefield may refer to:
Saratoga campaign, part of the American Revolutionary War
Battles of Saratoga, climax of the Saratoga campaign
First Saratoga: Battle of Freeman's Farm, September 19, 1777
Second Saratoga: Battle of Bemis Heights, October 7, 1777